The Lam Tsuen River is a river in Tai Po District, Hong Kong, with a length of 10.8 kilometres and a catchment area of approximately 21 square kilometres. It originates in Tai Mo Shan Country Park on the hill Sze Fong Shan, and joins other watercourses in the Lam Tsuen Valley. Joined by the Tai Po River in Tai Po New Town, it eventually empties into Tolo Harbour.

Kwong Fuk Bridge
Kwong Fuk Bridge (廣福橋) is a footbridge across the Lam Tsuen River. The first bridge on the site was erected in 1896, by local villagers. In early December 1941, the invading Japanese army crossed the bridge, then a steel girder construction, as they moved south. A road bridge was built on the site in 1948. A structure built in 1957 was replaced by the present version, which is in an ancient architectural style.

See also
List of rivers and nullahs in Hong Kong

External links

Rivers of Hong Kong, in Chinese

References

Lam Tsuen
Rivers of Hong Kong
Tai Po District